Prohibido Amar (Forbidden Love, Official release: Forbidden Passion) is a Mexican telenovela produced by Azteca in 2013. It is a remake of Colombian telenovela, La Sombra del Deseo. Soundtrack principal de la telenovela interpretado por Myriam Montemayor.  On 7 October 2013, Azteca started broadcasting Prohibido Amar weeknights at 8:30pm, replacing Secretos de Familia. The last episode was broadcast on 7 February 2014, with Siempre Tuya Acapulco replacing it the following week.

Episodes

References

Lists of Mexican television series episodes